John Bonello (born 10 May 1958) is a retired Maltese football player.

Club career
Bonello has played his entire career at Hibernians Paola, except for a season at German lower league side SC Herford.

International career
Bonello made his debut for Malta in an August 1979 friendly match against Tunisia. He earned a total of 29 caps, scoring no goals. He has represented his country in 7 FIFA World Cup qualification matches. Bonello was the goalkeeper in the infamous December 1983 European Championship qualification defeat by Spain, which Malta lost 1–12, ensuring that Spain qualified for Euro 1984 ahead of the Netherlands.

His final international was a January 1987 European Championship qualification match against Italy.

References

External links

1958 births
Living people
Association football goalkeepers
Maltese footballers
Maltese expatriate footballers
Malta international footballers
Hibernians F.C. players
Expatriate footballers in Germany